Dichapetalum madagascariense is a plant species originally described from Madagascar but now reported from many parts of mainland tropical Africa as well. It is reported from a wide region from Mozambique north to Tanzania and west to Liberia.

Dichapetalum madagascariense is a liana climbing over other vegetation.

References

madagascariense
Flora of Africa
Flora of Madagascar